Group G of the women's football tournament at the 2016 Summer Olympics was played from 3 to 9 August 2016, and included Colombia, France, New Zealand and United States.  The top two teams advanced to the knockout stage, while the third-placed team will also advance if they are among the two best third-placed teams among all three groups.

All times are BRT (UTC−3). For matches in Manaus, which is in AMT (UTC−4), local times are listed in parentheses.

Teams

Standings

Matches

United States vs New Zealand

France vs Colombia

United States vs France

Colombia vs New Zealand

Colombia vs United States

New Zealand vs France

References

External links
Football – Women, Rio2016.com
Women's Olympic Football Tournament, Rio 2016, FIFA.com

Group G